Beginner's luck refers to the supposed phenomenon of novices experiencing disproportionate frequency of success or succeeding against an expert in a given activity. One would expect experts to outperform novices - when the opposite happens it is counter-intuitive, hence the need for a term to describe this phenomenon. The term is most often used in reference to a first attempt in sport or gambling, but  is also used in many other diverse contexts. The term is also used when no skill whatsoever is involved, such as a first-time slot machine player winning the jackpot.

References

See also

Regression toward the mean
Amateur
Jinx

Luck
Mojo

Odds
Psychology
Rookie

Gambling terminology
Sports terminology
Luck